Fishpond Ltd. is a New Zealand e-commerce company. It was one of the first major companies to sell books over the Internet in New Zealand. Founded by Daniel Robertson in 2004, Fishpond.co.nz is a full-scale online bookstore. It also sells DVDs, music CDs, toys, household goods, cosmetics, and electronics. It is part of a larger business called WorldFront.

The company is headquartered in Auckland, with staff in Auckland, Christchurch, Melbourne, and Perth. It maintains software development centers in Auckland and Christchurch. Fishpond.com.au has a separate website in Australia.

In the middle of 2013, Fishpond had nearly 13 million items in its catalogue and was making 20,000 sales per day. By 2018, its catalogue had increased to over 25 million items, and it was selling a product every 1.2 seconds.

References

External links
 Fishpond
 WorldFront

Online retailers of New Zealand
Review websites
2004 establishments in New Zealand
Internet properties established in 2004